Song of the Night may refer to:

 Symphony No. 7 (Mahler) by Gustav Mahler, known as Lied der Nacht
 Symphony No. 3 (Szymanowski)
 Das Lied der Nacht, 1926 opera by Hans Gal
Song of the Night, 1992 TV bio-movie on Polish composer Karol Szymanowski played by Stephen Boxer

See also
Night Song (disambiguation)